Martha Liz Taboas Rivera (born 25 March 1989) is an American-born Puerto Rican retired footballer who has played as a defender. She has been a member of the Puerto Rico women's national team.

Early life
Taboas was raised in Orlando, Florida.

International goals
Scores and results list Puerto Rico's goal tally first.

References

External links

1989 births
Living people
Women's association football defenders
Puerto Rican women's footballers
Puerto Rico women's international footballers
Competitors at the 2010 Central American and Caribbean Games
American women's soccer players
Soccer players from Orlando, Florida
American sportspeople of Puerto Rican descent
College women's soccer players in the United States
Mars Hill University alumni
Palm Beach Atlantic Sailfish
Palm Beach Atlantic University alumni
Mars Hill Lions